Spectrin beta chain, brain 2 is a protein that in humans is encoded by the SPTBN2 gene.

Clinical significance

Mutations in this gene is associated with Spinocerebellar ataxia type 5.

Interactions 

SPTBN2 has been shown to interact with:
 ACTR1A, 
 Beta-actin, and
 UNC13B.

References

Further reading